Grapeview is a census-designated place (CDP) in Mason County, Washington, United States. The population was 954 at the 2010 census. It was part of the former Allyn-Grapeview CDP that was broken up into Allyn and Grapeview in 2010. Grapeview is connected to State Route 3 via Grapeview Loop Road.

Grapeview is home to a small Puget Sound Maritime Museum, and the Fair Harbor Marina.

History 
From the 1870s to the 1920s, transportation needs for Grapeview (once known as Detroit)  and other communities along Case Inlet were once served by a small flotilla of steamboats.

References

External links
 Grapeview page at Official Mason County Tourism website.

Census-designated places in Washington (state)
Census-designated places in Mason County, Washington